Thaicom Public Company Limited is a Thai satellite operator and provider of satellite and telecommunication services since 1991. The company operates a fleet of currently four satellites covering Asia, Oceania, and Africa. Thaicom is a subsidiary of Intouch Holdings Public Company Limited, Thailand's biggest telecommunications conglomerate.

History

The company's satellite project was named Thaicom by the King Bhumibol.

Thailand-based Shinawatra Computer and Communications Co. Ltd. (now INTOUCH HOLDINGS PLC) signed a US$100 million contract with Hughes Space and Communications Company Ltd. in 1991 to build Thailand's first communications satellite. Thaicom 1 was launched on 18 December 1993, carrying 12 C-band transponders and covering an area from Japan to Singapore.

The Company became a listed company on the Stock Exchange of Thailand on 18 January 1994, and is officially traded under the symbol THCOM.

Since its establishment, the company has expanded its business activities to include Internet and telephone services, as well as Direct to Home (DTH) satellite TV services . As of 31 December 2011, INTOUCH, which is the company's major shareholder, holds 41.14% of the company's shares.

Thaicom currently operates four satellites. The company also operates satellite ground facilities, including its satellite control center in Mueang Nonthaburi District, Nonthaburi Province, Thailand, and a teleport and DTH center in Lat Lum Kaeo District, Pathum Thani Province, Thailand.

On 1 January, 2022, the company announced a new CEO in Patompob Suwansiri

Launch history

References

External links

 thaicom.net

 
1991 establishments in Thailand
Telecommunications companies established in 1991
Communications satellites
Intouch Holdings
Telecommunications in Thailand
First artificial satellites of a country
Communications satellites of Thailand